Abel Pollet (9 October 1873 – 11 January 1909) was a French gangster and murderer. The leader, with his brother Auguste, of the Pollet gang, four of whose members, including Abel and Auguste, were beheaded in January 1909, as convicted murderers, thus reinstituting the death penalty in France.

Biography
Abel Pollet was born in Vieux-Berquin on October 9, 1873.

He became a smuggler who put his native gift for leadership to good use organizing his fellow traffickers into a more lucratively violent line of work. Thanks, presumably, to the syndicate’s pre-existing professional aptitude for evasion, it persisted for years and authored a quantity of robberies and murders that authorities could only guess at. (The official homicide estimation ran north of 50.) It was a spree so atrocious that it helped force the end of the whole death penalty moratorium since sentiment was so strong against the Hazebrouck gang.

The murders committed in northern France by the Pollet brothers' gang, also known as the Hazebrouck's bandits, hit the headlines.

Four members of the bandits were sentenced to death on 26 June 1908 in Saint-Omer.

The Capricornian in Rockhampton reported: 

Abel Pollet confessed of his own accord to participation in no fewer than 250 crimes.

Execution

The Advertiser in Adelaide ran about the quadruple execution on February 20, 1909:

See also 
 Anatole Deibler
 Guillotine

Sources 
 Jacques Messiant: L'Affaire Pollet – À l'origine des Brigades du Tigre. Éditions Ouest-France, Rennes 2015. .
 Sylvain Larue: Les nouvelles affaires criminelles de France. De Borée Éditions, 2009, p. 138–146.
 Carnets d’exécutions, 1885–1939, Anatole Deibler, présentés et annotés par Gérard A. Jaeger, Éditions L’Archipel, Paris 2004.
 Matthias Blazek: Räuberbande versetzte in den Jahren nach 1900 ganz Nordfrankreich in Schockzustand – Guillotine wird nach jahrelanger Pause für Vierfachhinrichtung 1909 in Béthune aufgestellt. In: Kameradschaftliches aus Fontainebleau – Mitteilungsblatt des Freundeskreises Deutscher Militärischer Bevollmächtigter in Frankreich, nr. 43 and 44, September 2015 and April 2016, Münster (Westfalen)/Adelheidsdorf, 2015/16, p. 8 ff. and 5 ff. 
 Matthias Blazek: Räuberbande versetzte in den Jahren nach 1900 ganz Nordfrankreich in Schockzustand – Guillotine wird nach jahrelanger Pause für Vierfachhinrichtung 1909 in Béthune aufgestellt. In: Journal der juristischen Zeitgeschichte (JoJZG), nr. 3/2014, de Gruyter, Berlin, 2014, p. 104 ff.

Notes and references

External links 
 1909: The Pollet gang, breaking the French moratorium.
  François CARON, Il y a cent ans : la fin de la « bande à Pollet » à Béthune, Généalogie 62, nr. 101, 1st trimestre 2009, Hénin-Beaumont, p. 31–37 (1800 ex.)
  Les exécutés, hazebrouck-autrefois.com.
  Les exécutés, hazebrouck-autrefois.com.
 Guillotine wird nach jahrelanger Pause für Vierfachhinrichtung 1909 in Béthune aufgestellt, Matthias-Blazek.eu.

1873 births
1909 deaths
20th-century French criminals
French gangsters